The 2015–16 season was Brøndby's 35th consecutive season in the top flight of Danish football, 26th consecutive season in the Danish Superliga, and 50th year in existence as a football club.

Squad

As of 25 June 2015.

Out on loan

Competitions

Overview

Overall

Danish Superliga

League table

Results summary

References

2015-16
Brondby
Brondby